The Mill River is a  tributary of Otter Creek in Rutland County, Vermont, in the United States.

The Mill River rises in the southern part of the town of Mount Holly, west of the Okemo Mountain ski area in the Green Mountains. It flows northwest, paralleled by Vermont Route 155, to the village of East Wallingford, where it continues north and northwest paralleled by Vermont Route 103 and the Green Mountain Railroad. Just before entering the town of Clarendon it passes through Clarendon Gorge, where it is crossed by the Appalachian Trail.

See also
List of rivers of Vermont

References 

Rivers of Vermont
Tributaries of Lake Champlain
Rivers of Rutland County, Vermont